Rebecca Abergel is a French inorganic chemist who specializes in the coordination chemistry between lanthanide and actinide complexes.  Alongside the effects of heavy element exposure and contamination on different biological systems. Abergel is currently a Faculty Scientist and Heavy Element Chemistry Group Leader at the Chemical Sciences Division of Lawrence Berkeley National Laboratory in Berkeley, California. She is also Assistant Professor of Nuclear Engineering at University of California, Berkeley.

Early life and education 
Abergel grew up near Paris, France, where she received her undergraduate degree in Chemistry from École Normale Supérieure in 2002. While an undergraduate, she received a scholarship to work under Prof. John Arnold, an inorganic chemist at the University of California, Berkeley.

She then pursued graduate studies at UC Berkeley, where she worked with Prof. Ken Raymond. For her doctoral work, she synthesised and characterised siderophore analogs to investigate how bacteria transport iron and to develop new iron chelating agents. Abergel graduated in 2006 with her Ph.D. in Chemistry.

Abergel was a joint postdoctoral researcher between the UC Berkeley Department of Chemistry and the group of Prof. Roland Strong at the Fred Hutchinson Cancer Research Center. Here she investigated how siderocalin binds to siderophores from bacteria such as Bacillus anthracis, for the development of new antibiotics.

Dr. Abergel joined Berkeley Lab in 2009, she received a Young Investigator Award from the Cooley's Anemia Foundation in 2009, a Junior Faculty Travel Award from the Radiation Research Society in 2013, and a Director's Award for Exceptional Scientific Achievement from Berkeley Lab in 2013.

Research interests
Abergel's BioActinide Research group conducts a variety of different experiments in the field of coordination chemistry, analytical chemistry, photophysics, biological chemistry, health physics, pharmacology, molecular biology, and cell biology. More specifically, her recent interests have focused on the coordination behavior of lanthanides and actinides. Her group is especially active in developing healing methods to treat people who have been exposed to radionuclides or atoms that contain excess nuclear charge.  In recent work by the BioActinide Research group, different actinide chelating agents have been synthesised which could be used to selectively bind radionuclides in the human body in order to safely remove them.

Currently, the only drug approved by the Food and Drug Administration to treat radionuclide contamination is diethylenetriaminepentaacetic acid (DTPA) (Figure 1). DTPA has shown some promise in treating plutonium poisoning, but this treatment is specific only to plutonium. Furthermore, DTPA must be administered intravenously, which is an issue due to the extremely time-sensitive nature of radiation poisoning. In the quest of finding a more versatile and easily administered treatment for radiation poisoning, Abergel sees potential in developing new classes of therapeutics.

The agent under investigation is an octadentate ligand consisting of four cross-linked dipicolinic acid components (Figure 2). This molecule is unique in having the potential for oral consumption in humans. It would function by coordinating as a chelating ligand with toxic actinides in the body before they can cause significant damage. In theory, once the chelating ligands have bound to the actinides, the heavy metal complexes can exit the body naturally by urination.

Due to its octadentate structure, the chelator of interest exhibits higher affinity for lanthanides in vivo than DTPA. Therefore, it has demonstrated better radionuclide decorporation in living systems. The ligand has shown favorable selectivity for plutonium, americium, uranium, and neptunium decorporation (with no observed toxicity in either in vitro tests on human tissue or in vivo experiments on rodent models), which is also an improvement over the currently accepted DTPA. Finally, in a separate study, Abergel evaluated the purity of this molecule for use as a drug, ultimately bringing this effort closer to the development of a deployable treatment solution.

An additional research project by Abergel's group involved testing the effectiveness of other analogs containing dipicolinic acid in eliminating plutonium (Figure 3). Results showed that both of the compounds were successful in removing plutonium over a seven-day period in mice. Overall, this work, along with further studies focusing on lanthanide and actinide chelation, has important implications for medicinal and environmental chemistry.

Awards and fellowships
 Directors Award for Exceptional Scientific Achievement (2013), Lawrence Berkeley National Laboratory, US
 Junior Faculty NCRP Award (2013), Radiation Research Society, US
 Young Investor Research Fellowship (2009–2010), Cooley's Anemia Foundation, New York, NY, US
 European Commission Marie Curie Actions Scholarship (2004), European School of Haematology, France
 Université Pierre et Marie Curie Annual Fellowship (2002), French Conseil Régional d’Ile de France, France

References

21st-century French scientists
21st-century French chemists
French women scientists
Living people
Year of birth missing (living people)
École Normale Supérieure alumni
UC Berkeley College of Engineering faculty
Lawrence Berkeley National Laboratory people
French women chemists
Inorganic chemists
21st-century French women